Zaozyorsk, formerly known as Zaozyorny, Severomorsk-7, and Murmansk-150, is a closed town in Murmansk Oblast, Russia. As of the 2010 Census, its population was 11,199; down from 12,687 recorded in the 2002 Census.

History
Building of what was to become Zaozyorsk began in 1958 as a base for a nuclear underwater fleet that would be deployed in 1961. Originally known as Zaozyorny, it was referred to as Severomorsk-7 for postal purposes. On September 14, 1981, it was granted town status and renamed Zaozyorsk, although for postal purposes the name Murmansk-150 was used. On January 4, 1994, the use of this code name was discontinued.

Administrative and municipal status
Within the framework of administrative divisions, it is incorporated as the closed administrative-territorial formation of Zaozyorsk—an administrative unit with the status equal to that of the districts. As a municipal division, the closed administrative-territorial formation of Zaozyorsk is incorporated as Zaozyorsk Urban Okrug.

References

Notes

Sources

Cities and towns in Murmansk Oblast
Closed cities